Juan Aceres (died 1549) was a Roman Catholic prelate who served as Bishop of Ciudad Rodrigo (1546–1549).

Biography
Juan Aceres was born in Spain. On 8 January 1546, he was appointed during the papacy of Pope Paul III as Bishop of Ciudad Rodrigo. He served as Bishop of Ciudad Rodrigo until his death on 31 July 1549.

See also 
Catholic Church in Spain

References

External links and additional sources
 (for Chronology of Bishops) 
 (for Chronology of Bishops) 

16th-century Roman Catholic bishops in Spain
Bishops appointed by Pope Paul III
1549 deaths